The University of Texas at Austin (UT Austin, UT, or Texas) is a public research university in Austin, Texas and the flagship institution of the University of Texas System. With 40,916 undergraduate students, 11,075 graduate students and 3,133 teaching faculty as of Fall 2021, it is also the largest institution in the system. 

Founded in 1883, UT Austin is considered one of the United States's Public Ivies. The university is a major center for academic research, with research expenditures totaling $679.8 million for fiscal year 2018. It joined the Association of American Universities in 1929. The university houses seven museums and seventeen libraries, including the LBJ Presidential Library and the Blanton Museum of Art, and operates various auxiliary research facilities, such as the J. J. Pickle Research Campus and the McDonald Observatory. 

 13 Nobel Prize winners, 4 Pulitzer Prize winners, 2 Turing Award winners, 2 Fields Medal recipients, 2 Wolf Prize winners, and 2 Abel Prize prize winners have been affiliated with the school as alumni, faculty members, or researchers. The university has also been affiliated with 3 Primetime Emmy Award winners, and as of 2021 its students and alumni have earned a total of 155 Olympic medals.

Student-athletes compete as the Texas Longhorns. The Longhorns have won four NCAA Division I National Football Championships, six NCAA Division I National Baseball Championships, thirteen NCAA Division I National Men's Swimming and Diving Championships, and the school has claimed more titles in men's and women's sports than any other member in the Big 12.

History

Establishment
The first mention of a public university in Texas can be traced to the 1827 constitution for the Mexican state of Coahuila y Tejas. Although Title 6, Article 217 of the Constitution promised to establish public education in the arts and sciences, no action was taken by the Mexican government. After Texas obtained its independence from Mexico in 1836, the Texas Congress adopted the Constitution of the Republic, which, under Section 5 of its General Provisions, stated "It shall be the duty of Congress, as soon as circumstances will permit, to provide, by law, a general system of education."

On April 18, 1838, "An Act to Establish the University of Texas" was referred to a special committee of the Texas Congress, but was not reported back for further action. On January 26, 1839, the Texas Congress agreed to set aside fifty leagues of land—approximately —towards the establishment of a publicly funded university. In addition,  in the new capital of Austin were reserved and designated "College Hill". (The term "Forty Acres" is colloquially used to refer to the University as a whole. The original 40 acres is the area from Guadalupe to Speedway and 21st Street to 24th Street.)

In 1845, Texas was annexed into the United States. The state's Constitution of 1845 failed to mention higher education. On February 11, 1858, the Seventh Texas Legislature approved O.B. 102, an act to establish the University of Texas, which set aside $100,000 in United States bonds toward construction of the state's first publicly funded university (the $100,000 was an allocation from the $10 million the state received pursuant to the Compromise of 1850 and Texas's relinquishing claims to lands outside its present boundaries). The legislature also designated land reserved for the encouragement of railroad construction toward the university's endowment. On January 31, 1860, the state legislature, wanting to avoid raising taxes, passed an act authorizing the money set aside for the University of Texas to be used for frontier defense in west Texas to protect settlers from the alleged attacks of Native peoples.

Texas's secession from the Union and the American Civil War delayed repayment of the borrowed monies. At the end of the Civil War in 1865, the University of Texas's endowment was just over $16,000 in warrants and nothing substantive had been done to organize the university's operations. This effort to establish a University was again mandated by Article 7, Section 10 of the Texas Constitution of 1876 which directed the legislature to "establish, organize and provide for the maintenance, support and direction of a university of the first class, to be located by a vote of the people of this State, and styled "The University of Texas".

Additionally, Article 7, Section 11 of the 1876 Constitution established the Permanent University Fund, a sovereign wealth fund managed by the Board of Regents of the University of Texas and dedicated to the maintenance of the university. Because some state legislators perceived an extravagance in the construction of academic buildings of other universities, Article 7, Section 14 of the Constitution expressly prohibited the legislature from using the state's general revenue to fund construction of university buildings. Funds for constructing university buildings had to come from the university's endowment or from private gifts to the university, but the university's operating expenses could come from the state's general revenues.

The 1876 Constitution also revoked the endowment of the railroad lands of the Act of 1858, but dedicated  of land, along with other property appropriated for the university, to the Permanent University Fund. This was greatly to the detriment of the university as the lands the Constitution of 1876 granted the university represented less than 5% of the value of the lands granted to the university under the Act of 1858 (the lands close to the railroads were quite valuable, while the lands granted the university were in far west Texas, distant from sources of transportation and water). The more valuable lands reverted to the fund to support general education in the state (the Special School Fund).

On April 10, 1883, the legislature supplemented the Permanent University Fund with another  of land in west Texas granted to the Texas and Pacific Railroad but returned to the state as seemingly too worthless to even survey. The legislature additionally appropriated $256,272.57 to repay the funds taken from the university in 1860 to pay for frontier defense and for transfers to the state's General Fund in 1861 and 1862. The 1883 grant of land increased the land in the Permanent University Fund to almost 2.2 million acres. Had the 1876 Constitution not revoked the original 1858 grant of land, by 1883, the university lands would have totaled 3.2 million acres, so the 1883 grant was to restore lands taken from the university by the 1876 Constitution, not an act of munificence.

On March 30, 1881, the legislature set forth the university's structure and organization and called for an election to establish its location. By popular election on September 6, 1881, Austin (with 30,913 votes) was chosen as the site. Galveston, having come in second in the election (with 20,741 votes), was designated the location of the medical department (Houston was third with 12,586 votes). On November 17, 1882, on the original "College Hill," an official ceremony commemorated the laying of the cornerstone of the Old Main building. University President Ashbel Smith, presiding over the ceremony, prophetically proclaimed "Texas holds embedded in its earth rocks and minerals which now lie idle because unknown, resources of incalculable industrial utility, of wealth and power. Smite the earth, smite the rocks with the rod of knowledge and fountains of unstinted wealth will gush forth." The University of Texas officially opened its doors on September 15, 1883.

Expansion and growth
In 1890, George Washington Brackenridge donated $18,000 for the construction of a three-story brick mess hall known as Brackenridge Hall (affectionately known as "B.Hall"), one of the university's most storied buildings and one that played an important place in university life until its demolition in 1952.

The old Victorian-Gothic Main Building served as the central point of the campus's  site, and was used for nearly all purposes. But by the 1930s, discussions arose about the need for new library space, and the Main Building was razed in 1934 over the objections of many students and faculty. The modern-day tower and Main Building were constructed in its place.

In 1910, George Washington Brackenridge again displayed his philanthropy, this time donating  on the Colorado River to the university. A vote by the regents to move the campus to the donated land was met with outrage, and the land has only been used for auxiliary purposes such as graduate student housing. Part of the tract was sold in the late-1990s for luxury housing, and there are controversial proposals to sell the remainder of the tract.

In 1916, Gov. James E. Ferguson became involved in a serious quarrel with the University of Texas. The controversy grew out of the board of regents' refusal to remove certain faculty members whom the governor found objectionable. When Ferguson found he could not have his way, he vetoed practically the entire appropriation for the university. Without sufficient funding, the university would have been forced to close its doors. In the middle of the controversy, Ferguson's critics brought to light a number of irregularities on the part of the governor. Eventually, the Texas House of Representatives prepared 21 charges against Ferguson, and the Senate convicted him on 10 of them, including misapplication of public funds and receiving $156,000 from an unnamed source. The Texas Senate removed Ferguson as governor and declared him ineligible to hold office.

In 1921, the legislature appropriated $1.35 million for the purchase of land next to the main campus. However, expansion was hampered by the restriction against using state revenues to fund construction of university buildings as set forth in Article 7, Section 14 of the Constitution. With the completion of Santa Rita No. 1 well and the discovery of oil on university-owned lands in 1923, the university added significantly to its Permanent University Fund. The additional income from Permanent University Fund investments allowed for bond issues in 1931 and 1947, which allowed the legislature to address funding for the university along with the Agricultural and Mechanical College (now known as Texas A&M University). With sufficient funds to finance construction on both campuses, on April 8, 1931, the Forty Second Legislature passed H.B. 368. which dedicated the Agricultural and Mechanical College a 1/3 interest in the Available University Fund, the annual income from Permanent University Fund investments.

The University of Texas was inducted into the Association of American Universities in 1929. During World War II, the University of Texas was one of 131 colleges and universities nationally that took part in the V-12 Navy College Training Program which offered students a path to a Navy commission.

After Brown v. Board of Education in 1954, Houston, Texas area teen Marion Ford had been accepted to become one of the first Black attendees. In an interview with a reporter he announced his desire to try-out for the famous Longhorn football team. The Ford Crisis would begin and all Black admissions at the time were rescinded until policy could be drawn up.  

In the fall of 1956, the first Black students entered the university's undergraduate class. Black students were permitted to live in campus dorms, but were barred from campus cafeterias. The University of Texas integrated its facilities and desegregated its dormitories in 1965. UT, which had had an open admissions policy, adopted standardized testing for admissions in the mid-1950s, at least in part as a conscious strategy to minimize the number of Black undergraduates, given that they were no longer able to simply bar their entry after the Brown decision 

Following growth in enrollment after World War II, the university unveiled an ambitious master plan in 1960 designed for "10 years of growth" that was intended to "boost the University of Texas into the ranks of the top state universities in the nation." In 1965, the Texas Legislature granted the university Board of Regents to use eminent domain to purchase additional properties surrounding the original . The university began buying parcels of land to the north, south, and east of the existing campus, particularly in the Blackland neighborhood to the east and the Brackenridge tract to the southeast, in hopes of using the land to relocate the university's intramural fields, baseball field, tennis courts, and parking lots.

On March 6, 1967, the Sixtieth Texas Legislature changed the university's official name from "The University of Texas" to "The University of Texas at Austin" to reflect the growth of the University of Texas System.

1966 shooting

On August 1, 1966, Texas student Charles Whitman barricaded the observation deck in the tower of the Main Building. Armed with multiple firearms, he killed 14 people on campus, 11 from the observation deck and below the clocks on the tower, and three more in the tower, as well as wounding two others inside the observation deck. The massacre ended when Whitman was shot and killed by police after they breached the tower.

After the Whitman event, the observation deck was closed until 1968 and then closed again in 1975 following a series of suicide jumps during the 1970s. In 1999, after installation of security fencing and other safety precautions, the tower observation deck reopened to the public. There is a turtle pond park near the tower dedicated to those affected by the tragedy.

Recent history
The first presidential library on a university campus was dedicated on May 22, 1971, with former President Johnson, Lady Bird Johnson and then-President Richard Nixon in attendance. Constructed on the eastern side of the main campus, the Lyndon Baines Johnson Library and Museum is one of 13 presidential libraries administered by the National Archives and Records Administration.

A statue of Martin Luther King Jr. was unveiled on campus in 1999 and subsequently vandalized. By 2004, John Butler, a professor at the McCombs School of Business suggested moving it to Morehouse College, a historically black college, "a place where he is loved".

The University of Texas at Austin has experienced a wave of new construction recently with several significant buildings. On April 30, 2006, the school opened the Blanton Museum of Art. In August 2008, the AT&T Executive Education and Conference Center opened, with the hotel and conference center forming part of a new gateway to the university. Also in 2008, Darrell K Royal-Texas Memorial Stadium was expanded to a seating capacity of 100,119, making it the largest stadium (by capacity) in the state of Texas at the time.

On January 19, 2011, the university announced the creation of a 24-hour television network in partnership with ESPN, dubbed the Longhorn Network. ESPN agreed to pay a $300 million guaranteed rights fee over 20 years to the university and to IMG College, the school's multimedia rights partner. The network covers the university's intercollegiate athletics, music, cultural arts, and academics programs. The channel first aired in September 2011.

In 2021, UT Austin leaders worked with Dan Patrick, Lieutenant General of Texas, and private donors to set up a Liberty Institute at the university. In 2022, Patrick said that the Liberty Institute was created to restrict teaching about critical race theory. Patrick's remarks sparked concerns about academic freedom and freedom of thought on campus.

The University's Division of Diversity and Community Engagement operates the University of Texas-University Charter School, a charter school system with 23 campuses across Texas.

Campus

One of the University's most visible features is the Beaux-Arts Main Building, including a  tower designed by Paul Philippe Cret. Completed in 1937, the Main Building is in the middle of campus. The tower usually appears illuminated in white light in the evening but is lit burnt orange for various special occasions, including athletic victories and academic accomplishments; conversely, it is darkened for solemn occasions. At the top of the tower is a carillon of 56 bells, the largest in Texas. Songs are played on weekdays by student carillonneurs, in addition to the usual pealing of Westminster Quarters every quarter-hour between 6 a.m. and 9 p.m. In 1998, after the installation of security and safety measures, the observation deck reopened to the public indefinitely for weekend tours.

The university's seven museums and seventeen libraries hold over nine million volumes, making it the seventh-largest academic library in the country. The holdings of the university's Harry Ransom Humanities Research Center include one of only 21 remaining complete copies of the Gutenberg Bible and the first permanent photograph, View from the Window at Le Gras, taken by Nicéphore Niépce. The newest museum, the  Blanton Museum of Art, is the largest university art museum in the United States and hosts approximately 17,000 works from Europe, the United States, and Latin America. The Perry–Castañeda Library, which houses the central University Libraries operations and the Perry–Castañeda Library Map Collection, is at the heart of campus. The Benson Latin American Collection holds the largest collection of Latin American materials among US university libraries, and maintains substantial digital collections.

The University of Texas at Austin has an extensive tunnel system that links the buildings on campus. Constructed circa 1928 under the supervision of UT engineering professor Carl J. Eckhardt Jr., then head of the physical plant, the tunnels have grown along with the campus. They measure approximately six miles in length. The tunnel system is used for communications and utility service. It is closed to the public and guarded by silent alarms. Since the late 1940s, the university has generated its own electricity. Today its natural gas cogeneration plant has a capacity of 123 MW. The university also operates a TRIGA nuclear reactor at the J. J. Pickle Research Campus.

The university continues to expand its facilities on campus. In 2010, the university opened the state-of-the-art Norman Hackerman building (on the site of the former Experimental Sciences Building) housing chemistry and biology research and teaching laboratories. In 2010, the university broke ground on the $120 million Bill & Melinda Gates Computer Science Complex and Dell Computer Science Hall and the $51 million Belo Center for New Media, both of which are now complete. The new LEED gold-certified,  Student Activity Center (SAC) opened in January 2011, housing study rooms, lounges and food vendors. The SAC was constructed as a result of a student referendum passed in 2006 which raised student fees by $65 per semester. In 2012, the Moody Foundation awarded the College of Communication $50 million, the largest endowment any communication college has received, so naming it the Moody College of Communication.

The university operates two public radio stations, KUT with news and information, and KUTX with music, via local FM broadcasts as well as live streaming audio over the Internet. The university uses Capital Metro to provide bus transportation for students around the campus on the UT Shuttle system and throughout Austin.

Organization and administration

The university contains eighteen colleges and schools and one academic unit, each listed with its founding date:

Cockrell School of Engineering (1894)
Dell Medical School (2013)
College of Education (1905)
College of Fine Arts (1938)
College of Liberal Arts (1883)
College of Natural Sciences (1883)
College of Pharmacy  (1893 in Galveston, moved to Austin 1927) 
Continuing Education (1909)
Graduate Studies (1910)
Jackson School of Geosciences (2005)
LBJ School of Public Affairs (1970)
McCombs School of Business (1922)
Moody College of Communication (1965)
School of Architecture (1948)
School of Information (1948)
School of Law (1883)
School of Nursing (1976)
School of Undergraduate Studies (2008)
Steve Hicks School of Social Work (1950)

Academics

The University of Texas at Austin offers more than 100 undergraduate and 170 graduate degrees. In the 2009–2010 academic year, the university awarded a total of 13,215 degrees: 67.7% bachelor's degrees, 22.0% master's degrees, 6.4% doctoral degrees, and 3.9% Professional degrees.

In addition, the university has nine highly selective honors programs, eight of which span a variety of academic fields: Liberal Arts Honors, the Business Honors Program, the Turing Scholars Program in Computer Science, Engineering Honors, the Dean's Scholars Program in Natural Sciences, the Health Science Scholars Program in Natural Sciences, the Polymathic Scholars Program in Natural Sciences, and the Undergraduate Nursing Honors Program in School of Nursing. The ninth is the Plan II Honors Program, a rigorous interdisciplinary program that is a major in and of itself. Many Plan II students pursue a second major, often participating in another department's honors program in addition to Plan II. The university also offers programs such as the Freshman Research Initiative and Texas Interdisciplinary Plan.

Admission

Undergraduate

The University of Texas at Austin encourages applicants to submit SAT/ACT scores, but it is not required. As of 2011, the university was one of the most selective universities in the region. Relative to other universities in the state of Texas, UT Austin was second to Rice University in selectivity according to a Business Journal study weighing acceptance rates and the mid-range of the SAT and ACT. The University of Texas at Austin was ranked as the 18th most selective in the South. 

As a state public university, UT Austin was subject to Texas House Bill 588, which guaranteed Texas high school seniors graduating in the top 10% of their class admission to any public Texas university. A new state law granting UT Austin (but no other state university) a partial exemption from the top 10% rule, Senate Bill 175, was passed by the 81st Legislature in 2009. It modified this admissions policy by limiting automatically admitted freshmen to 75% of the entering in-state freshman class, starting in 2011. The university will admit the top one percent, the top two percent and so forth until the cap is reached; the university currently admits the top 6 percent. Furthermore, students admitted under Texas House Bill 588 are not guaranteed their choice of college or major, but rather only guaranteed admission to the university as a whole. Many colleges, such as the Cockrell School of Engineering, have secondary requirements that must be met for admission.

For others who go through the traditional application process, selectivity is deemed "more selective" according to the Carnegie Foundation for the Advancement of Teaching and by U.S. News & World Report. For Fall 2017, 51,033 applied and 18,620 were accepted (36.5%), and of those accepted, 45.2% enrolled. Among freshman students who enrolled in Fall 2017, SAT scores for the middle 50% ranged from 570 to 690 for critical reading and 600–710 for math. ACT composite scores for the middle 50% ranged from 26 to 31. In terms of class rank, 74.4% of enrolled freshmen were in the top 10% of their high school classes and 91.7% ranked in the top quarter. For Fall 2019, 53,525 undergraduate students applied, 17,029 undergraduate students were admitted, and 8,170 undergraduate students enrolled in the university full or part time making the enrollment rate 31.8% overall. In the 2020–2021 academic year, 79 freshman students were National Merit Scholars.

Rankings

The University of Texas at Austin (UT Austin) was ranked tied for 38th among all universities in the U.S., and tied for 10th place among public universities according to U.S. News & World Reports 2022 rankings. Internationally, UT Austin was ranked 34th in the 2020 "Best Global Universities" ranking by U.S. News & World Report, 45th in the world by Academic Ranking of World Universities (ARWU) in 2019, 39th worldwide by Times Higher Education World University Rankings (2019), and 65th globally by QS World University Rankings (2020). UT Austin was also ranked 31st in the world by the Center for World University Rankings (CWUR).

The University of Texas at Austin is considered to be a "Public Ivy"—a public university that provides an Ivy League collegiate experience at a public school price, having been ranked in virtually every list of "Public Ivies" since Richard Moll coined the term in his 1985 book Public Ivies: A Guide to America's best public undergraduate colleges and universities. The seven other "Public Ivy" universities, according to Moll, were the College of William & Mary, Miami University, the University of California, the University of Michigan, the University of North Carolina, the University of Vermont, and the University of Virginia.

In its 2016 edition of college rankings, U.S. News & World Report ranked the Accounting and Latin American History programs as the top in the nation and more than 50 other science, humanities, and professional programs rank in the top 25 nationally. The College of Pharmacy is listed as the third-best in the nation and The School of Information (iSchool) is sixth-best in Library and Information Sciences. Among other rankings, the School of Social Work is 7th, the Jackson School of Geosciences is 8th for Earth Sciences, the Cockrell School of Engineering is tied for 10th-best (with the undergraduate engineering program tied for 11th-best in the country), the Nursing School is tied for 13th, the University of Texas School of Law is 15th, the Lyndon B. Johnson School of Public Affairs is 7th, and the McCombs School of Business is tied for 16th-best (with the undergraduate business program tied for 5th-best in the country).

The University of Texas School of Architecture was ranked second among national undergraduate programs in 2012.

A 2005 Bloomberg survey ranked the school 5th among all business schools and first among public business schools for the largest number of alumni who are S&P 500 CEOs. Similarly, a 2005 USA Today report ranked the university as "the number one source of new Fortune 1000 CEOs". A "payback" analysis published by SmartMoney in 2011 comparing graduates' salaries to tuition costs concluded the school was the second-best value of all colleges in the nation, behind only Georgia Tech. A 2013 College Database study found that UT Austin was 22nd in the nation in terms of increased lifetime earnings by graduates.

Research

UT Austin is classified among "R1: Doctoral Universities – Very high research activity." For the 2014–2015 cycle, the university was awarded over $580 million in sponsored projects, and has earned more than 300 patents since 2003. The University of Texas at Austin houses the Office of Technology Commercialization, a technology transfer center which serves as the bridge between laboratory research and commercial development. In 2009, the university created nine new start-up companies to commercialize technology developed at the university and has created 46 start-ups in the past seven years. License agreements generated $10.9 million in revenue for the university in 2009.

Research at UT Austin is largely focused in the engineering and physical sciences, and the university is a world-leading research institution in fields such as computer science. Energy is a major research thrust, with federally funded projects on biofuels, battery and solar cell technology, and geological carbon dioxide storage, water purification membranes, among others. In 2009, the University of Texas founded the Energy Institute, led by former Under Secretary for Science Raymond L. Orbach, to organize and advance multi-disciplinary energy research. In addition to its own medical school, it houses medical programs associated with other campuses and allied health professional programs, as well as major research programs in pharmacy, biomedical engineering, neuroscience, and others.

In 2010, the University of Texas at Austin opened the $100 million Dell Pediatric Research Institute to increase medical research at the university and establish a medical research complex, and associated medical school, in Austin.

The university operates several major auxiliary research centers. The Center for Agile Technology focuses on software development challenges. The J.J. Pickle Research Campus (PRC) is home to the Texas Advanced Computing Center which operates a series of supercomputers, such as Ranger (from 2008 to 2013 ), Stampede (2013–2017 ), Stampede2 (since 2017 ), and Frontera (since 2019). The Pickle campus also hosts the Microelectronics Research Center which houses micro- and nanoelectronics research and features a  cleanroom for device fabrication.

Founded in 1946, the university's Applied Research Laboratories at the PRC has developed or tested the vast majority of the Navy's high-frequency sonar equipment. In 2007, the Navy granted it a research contract funded up to $928 million over ten years. The Institute for Advanced Technology, founded in 1990 and located in the West Pickle Research Building, supports the U.S. Army with basic and applied research in several fields.

The Center for Transportation Research is a nationally recognized research institution focusing on transportation research, education, and public service. Established in 1963 as the Center for Highway Research, its projects address virtually all aspects of transportation, including economics, multimodal systems, traffic congestion relief, transportation policy, materials, structures, transit, environmental impacts, driver behavior, land use, geometric design, accessibility, and pavements.

In 2013, the University of Texas at Austin announced the naming of the O'Donnell Building for Applied Computational Engineering and Sciences. The O'Donnell Foundation of Dallas, headed by Peter O'Donnell and his wife, Edith Jones O'Donnell, has given more than $135 million to the university between 1983 and 2013. University president William C. Powers declared the O'Donnells "among the greatest supporters of the University of Texas in its 130-year history. Their transformative generosity is based on the belief in our power to change society for the better." In 2008, O'Donnell pledged $18 million to finance the hiring of university faculty members undertaking research in mathematics, computers, and multiple scientific disciplines; his pledge was matched by W. A. "Tex" Moncrief Jr., an oilman and philanthropist from Fort Worth.

The University of Texas at Austin Marine Science Institute is located on the Gulf coast in Port Aransas. Established in 1941, UTMSI was the first permanent marine research facility in the state of Texas and has since contributed significantly to our understanding of marine ecosystems. Research at the Marine Science Institute ranges from locally-important work on mariculture and estuarine ecosystems to the investigation of global issues in marine science, from the Arctic to the tropics.

Endowment

The University of Texas System is entitled to at least 30% of the distributions from the Permanent University Fund (PUF), with over $33 billion in assets as of year-end 2021. The University of Texas System gets two-thirds of the Available University Fund (the name of the annual distribution of PUF's income), and the Texas A&M University System gets the other third. A regental policy requires at least 45 percent of UT System's share of this money go to the University of Texas at Austin for "program enrichment". By taking two-thirds and multiplying it by 45 percent, UT gets 30 percent, which is the minimum amount of AUF income that can be distributed to the school under current policies. The Regents, however, can decide to allocate additional amounts to the university. Also, the majority of the University of Texas system share of the AUF is used for its debt service bonds, some of which were issued for the benefit of the Austin campus. The Regents can change the 45 percent minimum of the University of Texas System share to goes to the Austin campus at any time, although doing so might be difficult politically.

Proceeds from lands appropriated in 1839 and 1876, as well as oil monies, comprise the majority of PUF. At one time, the PUF was the chief source of income for Texas' two university systems, the University of Texas System and the Texas A&M University System; today, however, its revenues account for less than 10 percent of the universities' annual budgets. This has challenged the universities to increase sponsored research and private donations. Privately funded endowments contribute over $2 billion to the university's total endowment.

The University of Texas System also has about $22 billion of assets in its General Endowment Fund.

Student life

Student profile
For Fall 2011, the university enrolled 38,437 undergraduate, 11,497 graduate and 1,178 law students. Out-of-state and international students comprised 9.1% of the undergraduate student body and 20.1% of the total student body, with students from all 50 states and more than 120 foreign countries—most notably, the Republic of Korea, followed by the People's Republic of China, India, Mexico, and Taiwan. For Fall 2015, the undergraduate student body was 48.9% male and 51.1% female. The three largest undergraduate majors in 2009 were Biological Sciences, Unspecified Business, and Psychology, while the three largest graduate majors were Business Administration (MBA), Electrical and Computer Engineering, and Pharmacy (PharmD).

Residential life
The campus has fourteen residence halls, the newest of which opened in Spring 2007. On-campus housing can hold more than 7,100 students. Jester Center is the largest residence hall with its capacity of 2,945. Academic enrollment exceeds the on-campus housing capacity; as a result, most students must live in private residence halls, housing cooperatives, apartments, or with Greek organizations and other off-campus residences. University Housing and Dining, which already has the largest market share of 7,000 of the estimated 27,000 beds in the campus area, plans to expand to 9,000 beds.

Student organizations
The university recognizes more than 1,300 student organizations. In addition, it supports three official student governance organizations that represent student interests to faculty, administrators, and the Texas Legislature. Student Government, established in 1902, is the oldest governance organization and represents student interests in general. The Senate of College Councils represents students in academic affairs and coordinates the college councils, and the Graduate Student Assembly represents graduate student interests. The University Unions Student Events Center serves as the hub for student activities on campus. The Friar Society serves as the oldest honor society at the university and recognizes students who have made significant contributions to the school. Texas Orange Jackets, founded in 1923, is the oldest women's honorary service organization on campus and empowers young women leaders to serve the campus and community. The Texas Blazers, an honorary service organization, act as official hosts of the university. Texas 4000 for Cancer is another student organization, which also doubles as an Austin-based nonprofit, that hosts a 4,500-mile bike ride from Austin, Texas to Anchorage, Alaska, thus far raising over $5 million for cancer research and patient support services since its inception in 2004.

Greek life

The University of Texas at Austin is home to an active Greek community. Approximately 14 percent of undergraduate students are in fraternities or sororities. With more than 65 national chapters, the university's Greek community is one of the nation's largest. These chapters are under the authority of one of the school's six Greek council communities, Interfraternity Council, National Pan-Hellenic Council, Texas Asian Pan-Hellenic Council, Latino Pan-Hellenic Council, Multicultural Greek Council and University Panhellenic Council. Other registered student organizations also name themselves with Greek letters and are called affiliates. They are not a part of one of the six councils but have all of the same privileges and responsibilities of any other organization. Most Greek houses are west of the Drag in the West Campus neighborhood.

Media

Students express their opinions in and out of class through periodicals including Study Breaks magazine, Longhorn Life, The Daily Texan (the most award-winning daily college newspaper in the United States), and the Texas Travesty. Over the airwaves students' voices are heard through Texas Student Television (K29HW-D) and KVRX Radio.

The Computer Writing and Research Lab of the university's Department of Rhetoric and Writing also hosts the Blogora, a blog for "connecting rhetoric, rhetorical methods and theories, and rhetoricians with public life" by the Rhetoric Society of America.

Traditions

Traditions at the University of Texas are perpetuated through several school symbols and mediums. At athletic events, students frequently sing "Texas Fight", the university's fight song while displaying the Hook 'em Horns hand gesture—the gesture mimicking the horns of the school's mascot, Bevo the Texas Longhorn.

Athletics

The University of Texas offers a wide variety of varsity and intramural sports programs.

On June 12, 2020, UT student-athletes banded together with their #WeAreOne statement on Twitter. Among the list of changes included: renaming certain campus buildings, replacing statues, starting outreach programs, and replacing "The Eyes of Texas." UT Interim President Jay Hartzell released a statement on July 13, 2020, announcing the changes to be implemented in light of these demands from UT student-athletes. Hartzell said the university would make a multi-million dollar investment to programs that recruit, retain and support Black students; rename the Robert L. Moore Building as the Physics, Math and Astronomy Building; honor Heman M. Sweatt in numerous ways, including placing a statue of Sweatt near the entrance of  T.S. Painter Hall; honor the Precursors, the first Black undergraduates to attend the University of Texas at Austin, by commissioning a new monument on the East Mall; erect a statue for Julius Whittier, the Longhorns’ first Black football letterman, at DKR-Texas Memorial Stadium; and more. However, one of the most controversial topics on the list – replacing "The Eyes of Texas" as UT's alma mater – remained untouched.
 Further information: Horns Illustrated, print and digital university athletics publication.

Varsity sports

The university's men's and women's athletics teams are nicknamed the Longhorns. Texas has won 50 total national championships, 42 of which are NCAA national championships.

The football team experienced its greatest success under coach Darrell Royal, winning three national championships in 1963, 1969, and 1970. It won a fourth title under head coach Mack Brown in 2005 after a 41–38 victory over previously undefeated Southern California in the 2006 Rose Bowl.

The University's baseball team has made more trips to the College World Series (35) than any other school, and won championships in 1949, 1950, 1975, 1983, 2002, and 2005.

Additionally, the university's men's and women's swimming and diving teams lay claim to sixteen NCAA Division I titles, with the men's team having 13 of those titles, more than any other Division 1 team. The swim team was first developed under Coach Tex Robertson.

Notable people

Faculty

In the Fall of 2016, the school employed 3,128 full-time faculty members, with a student-to-faculty ratio of 18.86 to 1. These include winners of the Nobel Prize, the Pulitzer Prize, the National Medal of Science, the National Medal of Technology, the Turing Award, the Primetime Emmy Award, and other various awards. Nine Nobel Laureates are or have been affiliated with the University of Texas at Austin. Research expenditures for the university exceeded $679.8 million in fiscal year 2018.

Alumni

Texas Exes is the official University of Texas alumni organization. The Alcalde, founded in 1913 and pronounced "all-call-day," is the university's alumni magazine.

At least 15 graduates have served in the U.S. Senate or U.S. House of Representatives, including Lloyd Bentsen '42, who served in both Houses. Presidential cabinet members include former U.S. Secretaries of State Rex Tillerson '75, and James Baker '57, former U.S. Secretary of Education William J. Bennett, and former U.S. Secretary of Commerce Donald Evans '73. Former First Lady Laura Bush '73 and daughter Jenna '04 both graduated from Texas, as well as former First Lady Lady Bird Johnson '33 & '34 and her eldest daughter Lynda. In foreign governments, the university has been represented by Fernando Belaúnde Terry '36 (42nd President of Peru) and by Abdullah al-Tariki (co-founder of OPEC). Additionally, the Prime Minister of the Palestinian National Authority, Salam Fayyad, graduated from the university with a PhD in economics. Tom C. Clark, J.D. '22, served as United States Attorney General from 1945 to 1949 and as an Associate Justice of the Supreme Court of the United States from 1949 to 1967.

Alumni in academia include the 26th President of The College of William & Mary Gene Nichol '76, the 10th President of Boston University Robert A. Brown '73 & '75, and the 8th President of the University of Southern California John R. Hubbard. The university also graduated Alan Bean '55, the fourth man to walk on the Moon. Additionally, alumni who have served as business leaders include Secretary of State and former ExxonMobil Corporation CEO Rex Tillerson '75, Dell founder and CEO Michael Dell, and Gary C. Kelly, Southwest Airlines's CEO.

In literature and journalism, the school boasts 20 Pulitzer Prizes to 18 former students, including Gail Caldwell and Ben Sargent '70. Walter Cronkite, the former CBS Evening News anchor once called the most trusted man in America, attended the University of Texas at Austin, as did CNN anchor Betty Nguyen '95. Alumnus J. M. Coetzee also received the 2003 Nobel Prize in Literature. Novelist Raymond Benson ('78) was the official author of James Bond novels between 1996 and 2002, the only American to be commissioned to pen them. Donna Alvermann, a distinguished research professor at the University of Georgia, Department of Education also graduated from the University of Texas, as did Wallace Clift ('49) and Jean Dalby Clift ('50, J.D. '52), authors of several books in the fields of psychology of religion and spiritual growth. Notable alumni authors also include Kovid Gupta ('2010), author of several bestselling books, Ruth Cowan Nash ('23), America's first woman war correspondent, and Alireza Jafarzadeh, author of "The Iran Threat: President Ahmadinejad and the Coming Nuclear Crisis" and television commentator ('82, MS). Although expelled from the university, former student and The Daily Texan writer John Patric went on to become a noted writer for National Geographic, Reader's Digest, and author of 1940s best-seller Why Japan was Strong.

University of Texas at Austin alumni also include 112 Fulbright Scholars, 31 Rhodes Scholars, 28 Truman Scholars, 23 Marshall Scholars, and nine astronauts.

Several musicians and entertainers attended the university. Janis Joplin, the American singer posthumously inducted into the Rock and Roll Hall of Fame who received a Grammy Lifetime Achievement Award, attended the university, as did February 1955 Playboy Playmate of the Month and Golden Globe recipient Jayne Mansfield. Composer Harold Morris is a 1910 graduate. Noted film director, cinematographer, writer, and editor Robert Rodriguez is a Longhorn, as are actors Eli Wallach and Matthew McConaughey, the latter of which now teaches a class at the university. Rodriguez dropped out of the university after two years to pursue his career in Hollywood, but completed his degree from the Radio-Television-Film department on May 23, 2009. Rodriguez also gave the keynote address at the university-wide commencement ceremony. Radio-Television-Film alumni Mark Dennis and Ben Foster took their award-winning feature film, Strings, to the American film festival circuit in 2011. Web and television actress Felicia Day and film actress Renée Zellweger attended the university. Day graduated with degrees in music performance (violin) and mathematics, while Zellweger graduated with a BA in English. Writer and recording artist Phillip Sandifer graduated with a degree in History. Michael "Burnie" Burns is an actor, writer, film director and film producer who graduated with a degree in Computer Science. He, along with graduate Matt Hullum, also founded the Austin-based production company Rooster Teeth, that produces many hit shows, including the award-winning Internet series, Red vs. Blue. Farrah Fawcett, one of the original Charlie's Angels, left after her junior year to pursue a modeling career. Actor Owen Wilson and writer/director Wes Anderson attended the university, where they wrote Bottle Rocket together, which became Anderson's first feature film. Writer and producer Charles Olivier is a Longhorn. So too are filmmakers and actors Mark Duplass and his brother Jay Duplass, key contributors to the mumblecore film genre. Another notable writer, Rob Thomas graduated with a BA in History in 1987 and later wrote the young adult novel Rats Saw God and created the series Veronica Mars. Illustrator, writer and alum Felicia Bond is best known for her illustrations in the If You Give... children's books series, starting with If You Give a Mouse a Cookie. Taiwanese singer-songwriter, producer, actress Cindy Yen (birth name Cindy Wu) graduated with double degrees in Music (piano performance) and Broadcast Journalism in 2008. Noted composer and arranger Jack Cooper received his D.M.A. in 1999 from the University of Texas at Austin in composition and has gone on to teach in higher education and become known internationally through the music publishing industry. Actor Trevante Rhodes competed as a sprinter for the Longhorns and graduated with a BS in Applied Learning and Development in 2012. In 2016, he starred as Chiron in the Academy Award- and Golden Globe-winning film Moonlight.

Many alumni have found success in professional sports. Legendary pro football coach Tom Landry '49 attended the university as an industrial engineering major but interrupted his education after a semester to serve in the United States Army Air Corps during World War II. Following the war, he returned to the university and played fullback and defensive back on the Longhorns' bowl-game winners on New Year's Day of 1948 and 1949. Seven-time Cy Young Award-winner Roger Clemens entered the MLB after helping the Longhorns win the 1983 College World Series. NBA MVP and four-time scoring champion Kevin Durant entered the 2007 NBA Draft and was selected second overall behind Greg Oden, after sweeping National Player of the Year honors, becoming the first freshman to win any of the awards. After becoming the first freshman in school history to lead Texas in scoring and being named the Big 12 Freshman of the Year, Daniel Gibson entered the 2006 NBA draft and was selected in the second round by the Cleveland Cavaliers. In his one year at Texas, golfer Jordan Spieth led the University of Texas Golf club to the NCAA Men's Golf Championship in 2012 and went on to win The Masters Tournament three years after leaving the university. Several Olympic medalists have also attended the school, including 2008 Summer Olympics athletes Ian Crocker '05 (swimming world record holder and two-time Olympic gold medalist) and 4 × 400 m relay defending Olympic gold medalist Sanya Richards '06. Mary Lou Retton (the first female gymnast outside Eastern Europe to win the Olympic all-around title, five-time Olympic medalist, and 1984 Sports Illustrated Sportswoman of the Year) also attended the university. Garrett Weber-Gale, a two-time Olympic gold medalist, and world record-holder in two events, was a swimmer for the school. Also an alumnus is Dr. Robert Cade, the inventor of the sports drink Gatorade. In big, global philanthropy, the university is honored by Darren Walker, president of Ford Foundation.

Other notable alumni include prominent businessman Red McCombs, Diane Pamela Wood, the first female chief judge of the United States Court of Appeals for the Seventh Circuit, astrophysicist Neil deGrasse Tyson, chemist Donna J. Nelson, and neuroscientist Tara Spires-Jones. Also an alumnus is Admiral William H. McRaven, credited for organizing and executing Operation Neptune's Spear, the special ops raid that led to the death of Osama bin Laden. Oveta Culp Hobby, the first woman to earn the rank of a colonel in the United States Army, first commanding officer and director of the Women's Army Corps, first secretary of the Department of Health, Education, and Welfare attended the university as well.

See also
 Silicon Hills
 University of Texas at Austin High School
 University of Texas Elementary School

Notes

References

External links

 
 University of Texas at Austin Athletics website
 
 
 
 

 
University of Texas tower shooting
1883 establishments in Texas
Educational institutions established in 1883
Flagship universities in the United States
Tourist attractions in Austin, Texas
Universities and colleges accredited by the Southern Association of Colleges and Schools
Universities and colleges in Austin, Texas
University of Texas Austin
Austin